Ioannis Theodorakeas (born 26 March 1941) is a Greek rower. He competed in two events at the 1960 Summer Olympics.

References

1941 births
Living people
Greek male rowers
Olympic rowers of Greece
Rowers at the 1960 Summer Olympics
Sportspeople from Kalamata